The CMLL World Heavyweight Championship is a professional wrestling world heavyweight championship established in 1991 and promoted by Consejo Mundial de Lucha Libre (CMLL). CMLL introduced the championship to signal their independence from the National Wrestling Alliance (NWA), whose titles they had continued to promote after leaving the alliance in the late 1980s. As part of the move away from the NWA, CMLL established championships designated as "CMLL World Championships" for several weight divisions. The Heavyweight Championship was the first CMLL title to be created, and the inaugural champion was Konnan el Bárbaro, who won the title on June 9, 1991. The current champion is Hechicero, who is in his first reign. He defeated Diamante Azul in the finals of a tournament to win the vacant title on October 16, 2018. Sixteen different wrestlers have held the championship, split over twenty separate championship reigns.

In most professional wrestling promotions around the world, the "world heavyweight" designation is used to indicate the highest-ranking championship instead of an actual weight division. Traditionally, however, lucha libre has used multiple weight divisions, often with the lower weight classes receiving more attention from the promoters. CMLL carries on this tradition. As it is a professional wrestling championship, it is won not by actual competition, but by a scripted ending to a match.

History
The Mexican professional wrestling promotion Empresa Mexicana de Lucha Libre (EMLL) was founded in 1933 and initially recognized a series of "Mexican National" wrestling championships, endorsed by the Comisión de Box y Lucha Libre Mexico D.F. (Mexico City Boxing and Wrestling Commission). The Mexican National Heavyweight Championship was created in 1926, and over time, EMLL began promoting matches for that championship with the approval and oversight of the wrestling commission. In the 1950s, EMLL became a member of the National Wrestling Alliance (NWA), recognized the NWA World Heavyweight Championship as the highest ranking championship, and began promoting title matches for the NWA in Mexico on occasion.

In the late 1980s, EMLL left the NWA to avoid their politics and would later rebrand themselves as "Consejo Mundal de Lucha Libre" (CMLL). Although they had left the NWA, they were still promoting the NWA's titles. By the start of the 1990s, CMLL began to downplay the Mexican National Heavyweight Championship bouts, featuring them less frequently on CMLL shows, and eventually stopped promoting them altogether. In 1991, CMLL began creating a series of CMLL-branded world championships, the first of which was for the heavyweight division. The first champion was crowned in the finals of a 16-man tournament that saw Konnan el Bárbaro defeat Cien Caras. Konnan lost the title to Cien Caras in his first title defense on August 18, 1991, making him one of three champions without a single successful title defense.

Cien Caras left CMLL in the summer of 1992 to join former CMLL promoter Antonio Peña in Peña's newly formed Asistencia Asesoría y Administración (AAA) wrestling promotion, leaving CMLL without a heavyweight champion. CMLL held a 16-man single-elimination tournament from October 30, 1992, to November 20, 1992, which ended with Black Magic defeating Rayo de Jalisco Jr. to win the championship. With that victory, he became the first non-Hispanic, and so far the only British wrestler, to win the championship. On June 27, 1993, Mexican native Brazo de Plata defeated Black Magic for the title at Arena México, CMLL's main venue.

On April 18, 1997, Steel became the first Canadian to win the championship by defeating then-champion Rayo de Jalisco Jr. to become the eighth overall champion. In September 1997, Steel signed a contract with the World Wrestling Federation (WWF, now WWE) forcing CMLL to vacate the championship for the second time. Instead of holding a traditional tournament to crown another champion, CMLL had the new champion decided in a triple threat match between the top three heavyweight contenders, Universo 2000, Rayo de Jalisco Jr., and Cien Caras. On October 19, 1997, Universo 2000 won the title, starting the first of his three reigns, more than any other wrestler. Universo 2000 lost the title to and regained the title from Rayo de Jalisco Jr. Universo 2000's second reign as champion lasted 1,225 days, the championship's longest reign. This record-breaking run ended on April 18, 2003, when Mr. Niebla won the title. Mr. Niebla was champion for 543 days before Universo 2000 regained the championship for his record-setting third reign.

On July 8, 2007, Dos Caras Jr. became the fourteenth overall champion. His reign lasted 533 days, but only saw him defend the title a few times, defeating Lizmark Jr. and Último Guerrero. On December 22, 2008, Último Guerrero won the championship from Dos Caras Jr., who shortly afterwards left CMLL to work for WWE. On April 2, 2009, Último Guerrero successfully defended the title against Rey Mendoza Jr. on an independent wrestling promotion show in Gomez Palacio, marking the first time the CMLL World Heavyweight Championship was defended on a non-CMLL promoted show. After a 963-day reign and 17 successful defenses, Guerrero lost the title to Héctor Garza on August 12, 2011. The championship was vacated on November 11, 2011, after Garza left CMLL for Perros del Mal Producciones, a group of former CMLL wrestlers who broke away from the promotion in late 2011. On January 1, 2012, El Terrible became the new champion when he defeated CMLL World Light Heavyweight Champion Rush in a decision match. The two had won a torneo cibernetico match a week earlier to earn spots in the match.

Máximo Sexy won the championship on January 30, 2015, by defeating El Terrible. On May 22, 2017, then-reigning champion Máximo Sexy was fired by CMLL for his involvement in an act of vandalism and the championship was vacated. On June 6, 2017 Marco Corleone won a 10-man torneo cibernetico elimination match to become the new CMLL World Heavyweight Champion.

Reigns

The current champion is Último Guerrero, who won the title on October 16, 2018, after defeating Diamante Azul in the finals of a tournament for the previously vacant title. Universo 2000 holds the record for the most reigns at three. His second reign is the longest in the title's history at 1,225 days, and he also holds the record for the longest combined reign with 2,555 days. Konnan, who was the inaugural champion, holds the record for the shortest reign at 70 days. Three champions never had a successful title defense: both Garza and Steel left CMLL before they could defend the championship, and Konnan lost the championship in his first defense.

CMLL has been forced to declare the championship vacant five times. Each time, the reigning champion left CMLL without losing a match and the championship to whichever successor CMLL picked. Under normal circumstances, wrestlers give notice, or their contract is not renewed, and the championship transitions to a different wrestler. In the case of Cien Caras, Steel, Héctor Garza, and Marco Corleone, their departures from the company were so sudden and unexpected that no plans were in place and CMLL had to organize a tournament to determine the next champion. In Máximo Sexy's case, he was fired from the company while still the champion, causing the championship to be vacated as a result.

Rules

The championship is designated as a heavyweight title, which means that the championship can officially be competed for only by wrestlers weighing  and above. In the 20th century, Mexican wrestling enforced the weight divisions more strictly, but in the 21st century, the rules were occasionally ignored for the various weight divisions. The Heavyweight Championship was no exception as several champions were under the weight limit, including Héctor Garza, who was billed as weighing  when he won the championship and was thus considered a Junior Light Heavyweight. While the "world heavyweight" title is traditionally considered the most prestigious weight division in most professional wrestling promotions, CMLL places more emphasis on the lower weight divisions, and the CMLL World Heavyweight title is not considered the top CMLL championship.

With a total of twelve CMLL championships being labeled as "World" titles, the promotional focus shifts over time with no single championship being promoted as the "main" one. Championship matches are usually decided by two-out-of-three falls. On occasion, single-fall title matches have taken place, especially when promoting CMLL title matches in Japan, conforming to the traditions of the local promotion.

Tournaments

1991

The tournament to crown the inaugural CMLL World Heavyweight Champion ran from May 24 to June 9, 1991, and featured 16 competitors. The first round of the tournament saw two eight-man battle royals, each ending when four wrestlers were left in the ring. This was used to cut the field in half with the last four remaining wrestlers from each match advancing to the next round. Konnan, Rayo de Jalisco Jr., Black Magic, and Mascara Ano 2000 advanced in the first battle royal, while Brazo de Plata, Vampiro Canadiense, Universo 2000, and El Egipcio were eliminated. In the second battle royal, Nitron, Pierroth Jr., Pirata Morgan, and Cien Caras advanced while Fabulous Blondie, Gran Markus Jr., Máscara Sagrada, and El Egipcio were eliminated. The second round saw another pair of battle royals with four men in each, ending when two wrestlers were left in the ring. This narrowed the tournament down to the final four wrestlers, who faced off in traditional semi-finals matches, before the final match to crown the inaugural champion.

Tournament results

1992
After Cien Caras left CMLL for AAA in 1992, CMLL decided to hold a traditional 16-man single-elimination tournament to crown a new World Heavyweight Champion. The tournament ran from October 30 to November 20, 1992. On the first night of the tournament, all sixteen competitors competed in a battle royal where the order of elimination determined the pairings for the first round. The last two wrestlers were Vampiro and El Egipico, who faced off in the last of the first round matches. The first two matches of the first round were held on November 3, at CMLL's weekly "Martes de Coliseo" show where Rayo de Jalisco Jr. and Rick Patterson both won their matches, followed by Jalisco Jr. winning his quarterfinal match the same night. On November 6, at the weekly CMLL Super Viernes show, King Haku and Brazo de Plata advanced in the first round with King Haku qualifying for the semi-final match with another victory. On November 8, an additional tournament match was held with Pirata Morgan advancing to the second round. The November 10 show saw Black Magic and Kahoz advance to face each other, with Black Magic moving to the semi-finals. On November 11, CMLL held the final first round and quarterfinal match, which Vampiro won, and then held both the semi-finals on the same night. By the end of the night, Black Magic and Jalisco Jr. qualified for the final. The following week, at the November 20 Super Viernes, Black Magic won the finals and became the third CMLL World Heavyweight Champion.

Tournament results

2011–2012

On December 18, 2011, CMLL announced that their World Heavyweight Champion Héctor Garza had decided to leave CMLL to work for Perros del Mal Producciones, vacating the championship. They also announced that the following week there would be a tournament to determine a new champion. The main event of the December 25 Domigos Arena México show was a 10-man torneo cibernetico elimination match designed to reduce the field of championship contenders from ten to two. The match ended when El Terrible pinned Marco Corleone to eliminate him, leaving El Terrible and Rush to face off the following week. On January 1, 2012, El Terrible defeated Rush in two-out-of-three falls to become the seventeenth overall champion.

Torneo cibernetico – December 25, 2011

2017
Then-reigning CMLL World Heavyweight Champion Máximo Sexy was fired by CMLL on May 22, 2017 and the championship was declared vacant. The company announced that they were holding a 10-man torneo cibernetico on June 6, 2017 in Guadalajara, Jalisco to determine the next champion. The torneo ciberntico sides pitted Gran Guerrero, Euforia, El Terrible, Rush and Pierroth against Marco Corleone, Dragón Rojo Jr., Kráneo, Mr. Niebla and Rey Bucanero. The match came down to former champion El Terrible and Corleone, with Corleone gaining the deciding pinfall and the championship. With the victory, he became the 19th overall champion.

Torneo cibernetico order of elimination

Footnotes

References

External links
 Official CMLL Website

1991 establishments in Mexico
Sports organizations established in 1991
Consejo Mundial de Lucha Libre championships
World heavyweight wrestling championships
World professional wrestling championships